The Committee on International Relations (CIR) is a one-year master's degree graduate program in the Division of Social Sciences at the University of Chicago. It is one of the oldest international relations graduate program in the United States.

History
CIR was founded in 1928 by a group of University of Chicago professors, including Hans Morgenthau and Quincy Wright. While CIR is known worldwide for one of the most distinguished programs in the study of international security, CIR faculty and students are also well known for academic work in international political economy, international institutions, globalization, international law, human rights, comparative politics, development and regional studies.

Admissions
Applicants from CIR come from around the world; about 25 percent of applications and accepted students are from outside the United States. Every year, CIR receives over 300 applicants for roughly 40-50 spots. In the admissions process, applicants are required to provide the standard CIR application, letters of recommendations, a personal statement, a 10-20 page writing sample, and their GRE scores. International applicants from non-English speaking countries also have to provide TOEFL or IELTS scores as all coursework is conducted in American English. Applicants typically have a GPA of 3.5 (on a 4.0 scale) or higher and must have a BA degree (or similar) from an accredited university. In addition to an applicant's academic background, relevant work experience and fit with the program are also taken into account.

Applications are evaluated by an admissions committee which includes CIR preceptors and CIR faculty.

The program
The combination of intellectual diversity and analytical strength provide a stimulating environment for CIR students. The small size and intellectual rigor of the program ensure that students with differing perspectives will challenge each other and come to a more sophisticated understanding of the complicated interaction between the realities of international politics and international economics. The program provides excellent preparation for students, whether they choose to continue their graduate studies in leading doctoral programs, or decide to work in government or the private sector.

Each CIR graduate student is assigned a preceptor based on their own disciplinary and research interests in international relations, such as war, regional studies, or international economics.

Coursework
Students take three credited courses per quarter, which constitutes a full-load at the University of Chicago. Of the nine total courses, two are required "Core" classes, including a course on international security and another on international political economy. CIR students also take three mandatory non-credit classes, including two MA thesis workshops in the Fall and Winter quarters and a class taught by the CIR preceptors called "Perspectives on International Relations" in the Fall quarter. With the remaining seven credited courses, students are allowed to take any graduate-level course, with the following three restrictions: (1) seven of the nine courses must be on the CIR-approved course list, (2) at least three courses must be within the Division of Social Sciences, and (3) three courses must be taken in two of the four possible fields of study.

Fields of study
 International Security, Conflict Studies, and Contentious Politics
 International Political Economy and Development
 Comparative Studies in Political Institutions and Identity
 Human Rights, Environment, and International Law
 Research Methods in the Social Sciences

MA thesis
CIR students must also complete a thesis under the guidance of their preceptor and a faculty adviser of their choosing. Students will be aided by the two required MA thesis workshop classes in the Fall and Winter quarters. Each thesis is expected to be between 35-45 pages in length and below 14,000 words.

MA with specialization
CIR students who wish to pursue a particular research topic in greater depth than is possible in one year may pursue the second-year specialization program. Specialization is best designed for students who plan to continue with graduate studies in a Ph.D. program at the University of Chicago or elsewhere. Specialization is competitive; on average 10-12 students apply, and 2-4 are accepted.

Joint degrees
CIR offers joint degrees with different programs and schools at the University of Chicago.

 BA/MA - offered only to current University of Chicago undergraduates entering their senior year
 MA/MA - with the Harris School of Public Policy Studies
 MBA/MA - with the University of Chicago Graduate School of Business
 JD/MA - with the University of Chicago Law School

Notable faculty
 Bruce Cumings
 John Mearsheimer
 Robert Pape
 Eric Posner
 Paul Staniland
 Bernard Wasserstein
 Charles Lipson
 Dali Yang

References

External links
 CIR Website
 AM/MA-CIR -  Dual Degree Committee on International Relations (CIR)

University of Chicago
Schools of international relations in the United States
Realist think tanks
1928 establishments in Illinois